The British motorcycle Grand Prix is a motorcycling event that is part of the Grand Prix motorcycle racing season.

History 
Before 1977, the only British round was the Isle of Man TT, which was part of the FIM championship from its inauguration in 1949 until 1976.

The Isle of Man TT was the most prestigious event on the Grand Prix motorcycling calendar from 1949 to 1972. After the 1972 event, multiple world champion Giacomo Agostini dropped a bombshell on the motorsports world by stating he would never race at the Isle of Man TT again, saying the 37-mile (62 km) circuit was too dangerous for international competition. His friend Gilberto Parlotti was killed during the event. Many riders followed Agostini's boycotting of the next four events, and after the 1976 season, the Isle of Man TT was scratched from the FIM calendar.

The inaugural British motorcycle Grand Prix, the first motorcycle Grand Prix to be held on the British mainland, took place at the Silverstone Circuit. The event was moved to Donington Park in 1987 before returning to Silverstone in 2010.

Dorna Sports, the commercial rights holder of what is now known as MotoGP, revealed that they had signed a deal for the British Grand Prix to be moved to the yet-to-be constructed Circuit of Wales from 2015. However, when the developer indicated that the circuit would only be ready in 2016, the British motorcycle Grand Prix was slated to return to Donington Park for 2015 only but pulled out of hosting the event on 10 February 2015, citing financial difficulties. The following day, it was announced that Silverstone would host the British Grand Prix in 2015 and 2016. In September 2016, following further delays to the construction of the Circuit of Wales, Silverstone reached an agreement to continue hosting the event in 2017 with a further option for 2018.

In early November 2017, Silverstone announced a three-year deal to host the races in 2018, 2019 and 2020.

There was no race in 2018 due to weather conditions; it resumed in 2019. The 2019 British motorcycle Grand Prix saw one of the closest finishes in MotoGP history, when Álex Rins won the race ahead of Marc Márquez by 0.014 seconds. The 2020 race was cancelled due to the outbreak of COVID-19.

Official names
1977–1978: John Player British Grand Prix
1979–1985: Marlboro British Grand Prix
1986–1988: Shell Oils British Motorcycle Grand Prix
1989–1991: Shell British Motorcycle Grand Prix
1992: Rothmans British Grand Prix
1993, 1995–1996, 1998–1999, 2009: British Grand Prix (no official sponsor)
1994: British Motorcycle Grand Prix (no official sponsor)
1997: Sun British Grand Prix
2000–2004: Cinzano British Grand Prix
2005: betandwin.com British Grand Prix
2006: GAS British Grand Prix
2007: Nickel&Dime British Grand Prix
2008: bwin.com British Grand Prix
2010–2011: AirAsia British Grand Prix
2012, 2014: Hertz British Grand Prix
2013: HERTZ British Grand Prix
2015–2017: Octo British Grand Prix
2018–2019: GoPro British Grand Prix (cancelled in 2018)
2021–present: Monster Energy British Grand Prix

Winners

Multiple winners (riders)

Multiple winners (manufacturers)

By year

Notes

References

 
Recurring sporting events established in 1977
1977 establishments in England